Berwick and East Lothian was a constituency of the House of Commons of the Parliament of the United Kingdom. It elected one Member of Parliament (MP), using the first past the post system.

History
The constituency was created in 1950 and abolished in 1983.

Boundaries
Berwick and East Lothian covered the counties of Berwickshire and East Lothian. It was largely created from Berwick and Haddington and was replaced by East Lothian and part of Roxburgh and Berwickshire for the 1983 general election.

Members of Parliament

Elections

Elections in the 1950s

Elections in the 1960s

Elections in the 1970s

References

Historic parliamentary constituencies in Scotland (Westminster)
Constituencies of the Parliament of the United Kingdom established in 1950
Constituencies of the Parliament of the United Kingdom disestablished in 1983
Berwickshire
Politics of East Lothian
Politics of the Scottish Borders